Spoladea is a genus of moths of the family Crambidae described by Achille Guenée in 1854.

Species
Spoladea mimetica Munroe, 1974
Spoladea recurvalis (Fabricius, 1775)

References

Spilomelinae
Crambidae genera
Taxa named by Achille Guenée